Michael Timothy Lodish (born August 11, 1967) is an American former professional football player who was a defensive tackle in the National Football League (NFL). He was selected by the Buffalo Bills in the tenth round of the 1990 NFL Draft. A 6'3", 270-lb. defensive tackle and nose tackle from UCLA, Lodish played in 11 NFL seasons from 1990-2000 for the Bills and Denver Broncos.

Six Super Bowls
Lodish is tied with Don Beebe and Stephen Gostkowski for second in all-time Super Bowl appearances with six.  This is only behind Tom Brady, who played in his tenth Super Bowl on February 7, 2021, at Super Bowl LV in  Tampa, Florida (It is worth noting that Lodish and Gostkowski played in the Super Bowl six times, while Beebe only played in three of the six Super Bowls he was on the team for).  Lodish made four consecutive appearances with the Buffalo Bills in Super Bowls XXV, XXVI, XXVII & XXVIII and two appearances with the Denver Broncos in Super Bowls XXXII & XXXIII. The Buffalo Bills would lose all four consecutive Super Bowls, while the Denver Broncos would win their back-to-back appearances.

Personal
Lodish has worked as an NFL player agent at Ethos Sports Management from 2004 to 2009 and was a sales rep for a Michigan-based communications company, TVS Communication Solutions from 2009 to 2011.

He went to Brother Rice High School in Bloomfield Hills, MI.

References

1967 births
Living people
Players of American football from Detroit
American football defensive tackles
UCLA Bruins football players
Buffalo Bills players
Denver Broncos players